Caloptilia orientalis is a moth of the family Gracillariidae. It is known from the Russian Far East.

The larvae feed on Lonicera maackii. They mine the leaves of their host plant.

References

orientalis
Moths of Asia
Moths described in 1979